Profit and the Loss is a 1917 British silent drama film directed by A. V. Bramble and Eliot Stannard and starring James Carew, Randle Ayrton and Margaret Halstan.

Plot
When friends fail him, a tenant farmer turns to making money.

Cast
 James Carew - Dicky Bransome 
 Randle Ayrton - Jenkins 
 Margaret Halstan   
 Saba Raleigh

References

Bibliography
 Low, Rachael. The History of British Film, Volume 4 1918-1929. Routledge, 1997.

External links
 

1917 films
British drama films
British silent feature films
Films directed by A. V. Bramble
Ideal Film Company films
British black-and-white films
1917 drama films
1910s English-language films
1910s British films
Silent drama films